Dirty Harry is a 1971 film starring Clint Eastwood.

Dirty Harry may also  refer to:

Dirty Harry franchise
 Dirty Harry (character), Inspector Harold Francis Callahan, title character of the film and its sequels
 Dirty Harry (film series), a film franchise begun with the 1971 film
 Dirty Harry (1990 video game), an NES video game based on the franchise
 Dirty Harry (2007 video game), a canceled video game scheduled for a 2007 release by The Collective, Inc., based on the 1971 film of the same name
 Dirty Harry (pinball), a 1995 pinball game based on the franchise
 Dirty Harry novels, a series of tie-in novels attributed to the pen name Dane Hartman

People
 Dirty Harry (musician) (born 1982), British singer, stage name of Victoria Harrison
 Alfredo Lim, nicknamed "Dirty Harry" (born 1929), Filipino politician
 Derty Harry, (1973-2006) pseudonym of DeShaun Dupree Holton, better known as Proof, American rapper from the rap group D12

Other uses
 "Dirty Harry" (song), a 2005 song by Gorillaz
 Upshot-Knothole Harry, or Dirty Harry, a 1953 nuclear weapons test during Operation Upshot-Knothole
 "Dirty Harry", a season 4 episode of Dexter
 Dirty Harry, character from the musical Never Forget
 Dirty Harry round, a variant of the 5.56 standard NATO ammunition.